Salhawas is a village in Salhawas tehsil, Matanhail subdistrict, Jhajjar district, Haryana, India, in Rohtak division. It has a postal head office.

Demographics of 2011
As of 2011 India census, Salhawas had a population of 5962 in 1165 households. Males (3097) constitute 51.94%  of the population and females (2865) 48.05%. Salhawas has an average literacy (3942) rate of 66.11%, lower than the national average of 74%: male literacy (2340) is 59.36%, and female literacy (1602) is 40.63% of total literates (3942). In Salhawas, Jhajjar 13.09% of the population is under 6 years of age (781).

Adjacent villages
 Bithla
 Dhakla
 Nilaheri
 Humayupur
 Birar
 Bhindawas
 Niwada

Amboli

References

Villages in Jhajjar district